Cape laurel is a common name for several plants native to Southern Africa and may refer to:

 Cryptocarya woodii
 Ocotea bullata